Placaciura alacris is a species of tephritid or fruit flies in the genus Placaciura of the family Tephritidae.

Distribution
Russia.

References

Tephritinae
Insects described in 1869
Diptera of Asia